Maddi Wheeler is a Canadian ice hockey forward, currently playing for the Wisconsin Badgers in the NCAA. 

She captained and played for Napanee District Secondary School Golden Hawks women’s varsity team. Leading the team to 3 Kingston Area district championships, 2 Eastern Ontario (EOSAA) titles, and 2 Ontario Federation (OFSAA) tournaments. Her senior season saw the captain lead her team to a KASSA and EOSSA title. While being favorited to win the OFSSA Championship in March of 2019, the seniors season was cut short due to COVID before the tournament began.

Career 
Wheeler began playing hockey at the age of three. During high school, she played for the Nepean Jr. Wildcats and then the Kingston Ice Wolves in the Provincial Women's Hockey League.
 
In 2020, she began attending the University of Wisconsin, playing for the university's women's ice hockey programme. She scored her first collegiate goal in late November 2020, scoring the opening goal two minutes into Wisconsin's first victory of the 2020–21 season.

International career 
Wheeler represented Canada at the 2019 and 2020 IIHF World Women's U18 Championship, scoring a total of nine points in ten games, winning gold once and silver once. While playing with a groin injury, she scored the game-winning overtime goal in the 2019 gold medal game against the United States. Wheeler’s stellar goal put Hockey Canada’s U18 squad on top of the podium for the first time in 5 years  In 2020 Wheeler was an assistant captain helping the team secure a silver medal.

References

External links

2002 births
Living people
Wisconsin Badgers women's ice hockey players
Ice hockey people from Ontario
Canadian women's ice hockey forwards